Shawn Simpson (born August 10, 1968) is a Canadian retired ice hockey player who is currently an on-air personality on TSN 1200 radio in Ottawa. After retiring as a player, Simpson worked in the front office for both the Washington Capitals and the Toronto Maple Leafs organizations. He was the first goaltender chosen in the 1986 NHL draft, taken 60th overall by the Washington Capitals. Simpson was part of the Canadian national junior team that was disqualified from the 1987 World Junior Championship for their involvement in the infamous "Punch-up in Piestany". Simpson was also a 1st-team OHL all-star in 1987.

Bio
Simpson was born in Vancouver, British Columbia. His professional playing career was short, with only 35 games played over three seasons for the Baltimore Skipjacks, Washington's affiliate team in the AHL. He never played in an NHL game, although in 1988 and 1990 he dressed and sat on the bench twice as a back-up goaltender for the Capitals in playoff games. After retiring due to injury, Simpson joined the Capitals' television network, where he worked for two years as a colour commentator while completing law school at Georgetown University. He then served as a scout in the Washington Capitals organization for the next six years. In 1997, Simpson was promoted to director of hockey operations for the Capitals, and he also served as the general manager of the AHL's Portland Pirates, the Capitals' main affiliate. In 2004, Simpson left the Capitals organization and joined the Toronto Maple Leafs as a professional scout. In June 2008, Simpson was fired as part of a general shake-up in the Leafs organization. In April 2009, Simpson was hired by Glen Hanlon, with whom he had previously worked in Washington, to be the deputy director of hockey operations for HC Dinamo Minsk in the KHL. Both men were fired in October 2009. Later that same year, Simpson became the president of the Cape Cod Cubs of the International Junior Hockey League.

Simpson began working for sports radio station The Team 1200 in Ottawa in January 2012, where he co-hosted "The Drive" with Dave Gross, as well as the Ottawa Senators post-game broadcasts.

In October 2013, The Team 1200 was rebranded as TSN 1200. Simpson now hosts "Mornings" with co-host "El-Predicto" John Rodenburg.

External links

Notes and references

1968 births
Living people
Baltimore Skipjacks players
Canadian ice hockey goaltenders
Oshawa Generals players
Sault Ste. Marie Greyhounds players
Ice hockey people from Vancouver
Washington Capitals draft picks
Canadian expatriate sportspeople in Belarus
Canadian expatriate ice hockey players in the United States
Washington Capitals announcers